John Levesham (died 1418) was the member of the Parliament of England for Salisbury for the parliaments of 1401 and 1404. A clothes merchant by profession, he held multiple important roles. He was a church-warden in Salisbury (circa 1395) and was also a tax collector in Wiltshire (circa 1388) and Salisbury (circa 1393). He was also a member of the Convocation of Salisbury by 1409. He was the reeve of Salisbury from 1396 to 1397 and held mayoral responsibilities from 1414 to 1415.

References 

Members of Parliament for Salisbury
English MPs 1401
Year of birth unknown
1418 deaths
Reeves (England)
Mayors of Salisbury
English MPs January 1404